Joseph Michael Milinichik (born March 30, 1963 in Allentown, Pennsylvania) is a former American football guard who played 10 seasons in the National Football League with the Detroit Lions, Los Angeles Rams, and San Diego Chargers.

High school
Milinichik began his football career at Emmaus High School in Emmaus, Pennsylvania. The school competes in Pennsylvania's Eastern Pennsylvania Conference.

College
He played collegiate football at North Carolina State University.

National Football League
He was drafted by the Detroit Lions in the 3rd round of the 1986 NFL Draft with the 69th overall selection. He later went on to play for the Los Angeles Rams. He finished his career with the San Diego Chargers, where he played in Super Bowl XXIX.

References

External links
Joe Milinichik at NFL.com

1963 births
Living people
American football offensive linemen
Detroit Lions players
Emmaus High School alumni
Los Angeles Rams players
NC State Wolfpack football players
Sportspeople from Allentown, Pennsylvania
San Diego Chargers players
Players of American football from Pennsylvania
Ed Block Courage Award recipients